Lee Chae-Mi (born June 23, 2006) is a South Korean child actress. She is best known for playing the daughter in need of a bone marrow transplant in the 2013 television series Two Weeks.

Filmography

Television series

Films

References

External links

2006 births
Living people
21st-century South Korean actresses
South Korean child actresses
South Korean film actresses
South Korean television actresses